"He Knows You Know" is a song by the British neo-progressive rock band Marillion. It was their second single, with "Charting the Single" as the B-side. It was released from their first album, Script for a Jester's Tear, and peaked at number 35 on the UK Singles Chart. The song's theme is drug abuse, and alludes particularly to intravenous drug use. In concert, lead vocalist Fish would often introduce it as "The Drug Song" and state that it was inspired by drug use while he was working at the Job/Benefits centre in Aylesbury.

As with all Marillion songs during this period, the lyrics were written by Fish. The music video for this song features Fish struggling in a straitjacket having visions of a Jackson's Chameleon as featured on the album artwork of Marillion's first three albums.

"He Knows You Know" is the only 12-inch single from Marillion's first three albums that was never produced as a picture disc. The song was supposed to be performed live on Top Of The Pops in 1983, but as Fish explains during the concert recorded for Recital of the Script, this never happened. However, a live version was later recorded for the BBC Oxford Road Show.

A CD replica of the single was also part of a collectors' box-set released in July 2000, which contained Marillion's first twelve singles and was re-issued as a 3-CD set in 2009 (see The Singles '82-'88).

Track listing 7" version
Side A
"He Knows You Know" (single edit) – 3:33
Side B
"Charting the Single" – 4:53

Track listing 12" version
Side A
"He Knows You Know" (album version) – 5:07
Side B
"He Knows You Know" (single edit) – 3:33
"Charting the Single" – 4:53

Personnel
 Fish – vocals
 Steve Rothery - guitars
 Mark Kelly - keyboards
 Pete Trewavas - bass
 Mick Pointer - drums

References

External links
Music video on YouTube

Marillion songs
1983 singles
Songs about drugs
Songs written by Fish (singer)
Songs written by Steve Rothery
Songs written by Pete Trewavas
Songs written by Mark Kelly (keyboardist)
1983 songs